"Better Man" is a song by British pop singer Robbie Williams, released as the final single from his third studio album, Sing When You're Winning (2000), in October 2001. It was released only in Australia, New Zealand, and Latin America. A music video for the Australian release was produced in 2001, reusing scenes from Williams' "Eternity" music video (since the single was not released in that territory) intercut with a live performance of "Better Man" from his The Sermon on the Mount Tour in Manchester, England, in October 2000, overdubbed with the studio version.

Spanish version
Robbie Williams recorded a Spanish version of the song called "" ("To Be Better"). It was included on the Latin American pressings of Sing When You're Winning.

Release and success
In New Zealand, "Better Man" began receiving airplay in late 2000. It eventually peaked at number four on the RIANZ Singles Chart for two weeks in December 2000. The promotional disc of "Ser mejor" was sent to Latin American radio stations in 2001. In Australia, "Better Man" was released as a CD single on 22 October 2001. It appeared on the ARIA Singles Chart the following week, climbing to number eight during its ninth week on the chart and reaching its peak of number six on 20 January 2002, spending four nonconsecutive weeks at that position and remaining in the top 50 for 29 weeks. It sold over 35,000 copies, earning a gold certification from the Australian Recording Industry Association (ARIA).

Track listing
Australian CD single
 "Better Man" – 3:24
 "My Way" (live) – 4:35
 "Rolling Stone" – 3:43
 "Toxic" – 3:51
 "Let Love Be Your Energy" (video) – 4:18

Credits and personnel
Credits are taken from the Sing When You're Winning album booklet.

Studios
 Recorded at Master Rock Studios (North London, England) and Sarm Hook End (Reading, England)
 Mixed at Battery Studios (London, England)
 Mastered at Metropolis Mastering (London, England)

Personnel

 Robbie Williams – writing, lead vocals
 Guy Chambers – writing, piano, orchestration, production, arrangement
 Dave Catlin-Birch – backing vocals, bass guitar
 Steve McEwan – backing vocals
 Gary Nuttall – backing vocals
 Phil Palmer – 12-string guitar
 Neil Taylor – electric guitars
 Chris Sharrock – drums
 Andy Duncan – percussion
 London Session Orchestra – orchestra
 Gavyn Wright – concertmaster
 Nick Ingman – orchestration
 Isobel Griffiths – orchestral contractor
 Steve Price – orchestral engineering
 Steve Power – production, mixing, Pro Tools
 Richard Flack – Pro Tools
 Tony Cousins – mastering

Charts

Weekly charts

Year-end charts

Certifications and sales

References

Robbie Williams songs
2000 songs
2001 singles
Chrysalis Records singles
EMI Records singles
Song recordings produced by Guy Chambers
Song recordings produced by Steve Power
Songs written by Guy Chambers
Songs written by Robbie Williams